Golian or Goliyan or Golyan or Gelian or Geliyan or Gelyan may refer to:

India==Nepal
 Golian, India
 Golyan Group

Iran
 Goliyan, Hamadan
 Geliyan, Kurdistan
 Gelian, Mazandaran
 Golian, North Khorasan
 Golian, South Khorasan
 Golian Rural District, in North Khorasan Province

Nepal
 Golyan Group, Kathmandu
 Akshay Golyan, Kathmandu
 Pawan Golyan, Kathmandu
 Shakti Golyan, Kathmandu
 Ananta Golyan, Kathmandu
 Hyatt Place Kathmandu, in Province 2, Kathmandu, Nepal

Persons
 Ján Golian (1906–1945), Slovak Brigadier General